Gereja Sion (Indonesian for "Sion Church") is a historic church located in Pinangsia Administrative District, Taman Sari, Jakarta, Indonesia. Dating from 1695, it is the oldest church still standing in Jakarta.

History

The church was formerly known as De Nieuwe Portugeesche Buitenkerk ("The New Portuguese Outer Church"), referring to its position on the outside of the city wall, as opposed to Portugeesche Binnenkerk, "the Portuguese Inner Church"). The church was also known as Belkita during the period.

The church was built outside the old city walls for the so-called "black Portuguese" - the Eurasians and natives captured from Portuguese trading posts in India and Malaya and brought to Jakarta (then Batavia) as slaves. Most of these people were Catholics, but were given their freedom on the condition that they joined the Dutch Reformed Church, and the converts were known as Mardijker or the liberated ones.

The construction of the church was started in 1693. It was officially opened on Sunday, October 23, 1695, and was jointly financed by the Portuguese and the VOC Government. The first sermon was delivered by Reverend Theodorus Zas and was attended by Governor-General Willem van Outhoorn.

Later, the church name changed into "Portuguese Church". During the Japanese occupation of Indonesia in 1942, the name "Portuguese Church" was forbidden and the church was closed for two years. The Japanese army wished to transform the place into a columbarium for the fallen soldiers.

During the governmental transition, the Dutch government transferred the ownership of the church to the Protestant Church in Western Indonesia (Gereja Protestan di Indonesia bagian Barat) or GPIB. During the 1957 GPIB Sinode Conference, the Portuguese Church changed its name into GPIB Congregation of Zion (GPIB Jemaat Sion), and since then, the church is known as Zion Church.

The church was restored in 1920 and 1978. The building is protected through the Law SK Gubernur DKI Jakarta CB/11/1/12/1972

In 1984, the churchyard was reduced for road construction.

Building

Sion Church measures 24 by 32 meters and is situated on 6,725 square meters of land. An extension was built on the back facade, measuring 6 by 18 meters. It was built above a foundation of 10,000 logs. The construction is designed by E. Ewout Verhagen from Rotterdam. The wall is constructed from bricks glued by a mix of sand and heatproof sugar.

Sion Church is characteristically Dutch with its plain facade, ward-like appearance and domed windows. The church contains copper chandeliers, a baroque-style ebony pulpit, and the original organ. The furnishings were made by craftsmen from Formosa (Taiwan). The pipe organ was donated by the daughter of Reverend John Maurits Moor.

2,381 people were buried in the graveyard during 1790 alone, however, few tombs remain.
The ornate bronze tombstone of Governor-General Hendrick Zwaardecroon who died in 1728 was buried, as was his wish, among "ordinary" people.

See also

List of church buildings in Indonesia
History of Jakarta

References

Churches in Jakarta
Colonial architecture in Jakarta
Churches completed in 1695
Cultural Properties of Indonesia in Jakarta
Dutch colonial architecture in Indonesia
1695 establishments in the Dutch Empire
Former Roman Catholic church buildings